During the American Civil War, the Commonwealth of Kentucky contributed a large number of officers, politicians, and troops to the war efforts of both the Union and Confederacy. Most notable among all of these were Abraham Lincoln, President of the United States (born near Hodgenville, Kentucky) and Jefferson Davis, President of the Confederate States (born in Fairview, Kentucky).

The following is a partial list of generals or naval officers (at or above the rank of commodore) either born in Kentucky or living in Kentucky when they joined the army or navy (or in a few cases, men who were buried in Kentucky following the war, although they did not directly serve in Kentucky units). Those given the temporary or honorary rank of brevet brigadier general, are also included in this list.

Union

Confederate

See also

 Kentucky in the American Civil War

Kentucky in the American Civil War
People of Kentucky in the American Civil War